Mister Universe is a 1951 American comedy film. It was produced by Eagle Lion Pictures and directed by Joseph Lerner.

Plot 
Honest "Mr. Universe" winner Tommy Tompkins struggles when he is told to lose a wrestling match.

Partial cast 

 Jack Carson as Jeff Clayton
 Janis Paige as Lorraine
 Vince Edwards as Tommy Tompkins
 Bert Lahr as Joe Pulaski
 Robert Alda as Fingers Maroni
 Maxie Rosenbloom as Big Ears, the trainer
Joan Rivers as teenage girl in audience (uncredited)

Production 
Mister Universe was filmed in New York.

Reception 
Variety found the dialogue "weak" but the film "quite funny" with good performances. Variety noted that the film did not treat the wrestling business "with its phoney grapplers and decisions, and crooked promoters" lightly, but that it probably took it more seriously than the press and sports communities.

Picturegoer wrote "True, much of the fun springs from the mauling of stooges, but the humour is no less effective for being elementary, or rather primitive."

The cast was praised by The New York Times.

Trivia 
Joan Rivers appears in an uncredited role.

Mister Universe marked the film debut of Vince Edwards.

A comic adaptation of the film was published by Eastern Color in the December 1950 issue of the anthology comic book Movie Love, only a month before the film's release.

External links

References 

1951 films
American comedy films
Wrestling films
Eagle-Lion Films films
1951 comedy films
American black-and-white films
1950s American films